This is a list of the German Media Control Top100 Singles chart number ones of 1976.

See also
List of number-one hits (Germany)

References
 German Singles Chart archives from 1956
 Media Control Chart archives from 1960

1976 in Germany
1976 record charts
1976